The School District of Superior is a school district in Wisconsin, United States that serves students in the city of Superior; the towns of Oakland, Parkland, Summit, and Superior; and the villages of Oliver and Superior. The district also provides services to some students not living in the district as a part of open enrollment. The School District of Superior is the 23rd largest school district in Wisconsin and one of the largest employers in Douglas County. The Superintendent of Schools is Amy Starzecki.

The district is divided into departments: Buildings and Grounds, Business Office, Curriculum/Instruction, Food Service, Health, Indian Education, Information Technology, Special Education, Student Services, Superintendent, and Transportation departments. It operates in accordance with local, state, and federal laws and the bylaws of the School Board of the School District of Superior.

The School District provides a universally free breakfast to elementary and middle school students. It has a random drug testing policy that requires students who are in extra-curricular activities or parking on school grounds to enter their names into a pool to be randomly selected to complete a urine drug test.  Students may also choose to become volunteer members of the drug testing pool in a program called Pledgemakers.

Schools
The School District of Superior comprises one high school, one middle school, and six elementary schools, with a total enrollment of over 5,000 students. The district has 2,322 students enrolled in elementary schools, 1,027 in middle school, and 1,633 in high school. District property encompasses about  The district owns a school forest in the Town of Summit that is used as an outdoor classroom. It has three classroom buildings and trails.

Elementary schools:
Bryant Elementary School
Cooper Elementary School
Four Corners Elementary School
Great Lakes Elementary School
Lake Superior Elementary School
Northern Lights Elementary School

Middle schools:
Superior Middle School

High schools:
Superior High School

References

School districts in Wisconsin
Education in Douglas County, Wisconsin